Emmanuel FC is a football club of East Timor based in Dili. The team plays in the Liga Futebol Amadora.

Between 2017 and 2019, he played in the third division of the national football championship (2019 LFA Terceira), being promoted in the latter to the second division (Liga Futebol Amadora Segunda Divisão).

Competitions per year

2017
In 2017, the Liga Futebol Amadora Terceira Divisão had not yet been created. However, the FFTL organized a playoff competition officially named as the Segunda Divisaun Promotion Playoff. And it was in this competition that the official debut of the Emmanuel FC team took place on May 19, 2017 against the FC FIEL team.

The three teams with the best campaigns would  (AS Lero (Iliomar), Lalenok United F.C. (Dili) and FC Fiel) win the right to join Liga Futebol Amadora Segunda Divisão. The Emmanuel FC team was unable to gain access.

2019
In 2019 FFTL created Liga Futebol Amadora Terceira Divisão. The competition 2019 Liga Futebol Amadora Terceira Divisão had the participation of 11 teams divided into 2 groups. Two teams (The best team in each group) would be promoted to Liga Futebol Amadora Segunda Divisão. With 5 wins in 5 matches, the Emmanuel FC team managed to get the promotion with the best campaign.

2020
Due to the pandemic of COVID-19, the FFTL canceled the 2020 edition of LFA Primeira and also LFA Segunda, a competition in which the Emmanuel FC team would participate for the first time. Instead of this, the FFTL carried out only the Coppettions 2020 Copa FFTL and the Taça 12 de Novembro. EmmanuelFC played in both competitions.

Copa FFTL
In 2020, the club participated in the 2020 Copa FFTL, the competition had 20 clubs divided into 4 groups of 5 teams, the two teams that had the most points in the group would advance to the Quarterfinals. With just one win, one draw and two defeats, the Emmanuel FC team ended their participation in third place in group D.

Taça 12 de Novembro
The 2020 edition of the Taça 12 de Novembro was played by 19 clubs. The competition was divided into 5 phases: Preliminary Round, 1/8 Finals, Quarterfinals, Semifinals and Final.

The EmmanuelFC team did not have to compete in the preliminary round and has already started in the second round by winning the Santa Cruz FC (East Timor) team 2–0.

EmmanuelFC's team was eliminated in the quarterfinals after losing the match against Boavista FC by the score of 3–0.

References

Football clubs in East Timor
Football
Sport in Dili
Association football clubs established in 2017